The 2015 World Junior Ice Hockey Championship Division I was played in two groups of six teams each. In each group the first-placed team is promoted to a higher level, while the last-placed team is relegated to a lower level. The winners of Division I B, Kazakhstan, were promoted to the 2016 Division I A and the winners of Division I A, Belarus, were promoted to the 2016 top division. Divisions I A and I B represent the second and the third tier of the IIHF World U20 Championship.

Division I A
The Division I A tournament was played in Asiago, Italy, from 14 to 20 December 2014.

Participants

Final standings

Results
All times are local (Central European Time – UTC+1).

Statistics

Top 10 scorers

Goaltending leaders
(minimum 40% team's total ice time)

Awards

Best Players Selected by the Directorate
 Goaltender:  Matiss Kivlenieks
 Defenceman:  Mattias Norstebo
 Forward:  Dmitri Ambrozheichik

Division I B
The Division I B tournament was played in Dunaújváros, Hungary, from 14 to 20 December 2014.

Participants

Final standings

Results
All times are local (Central European Time – UTC+1).

Statistics

Top 10 scorers

Goaltending leaders
(minimum 40% team's total ice time)

Awards

Best Players Selected by the Directorate
 Goaltender:  Michael Luba
 Defenceman:  Pierre Crinon
 Forward:  Kirill Savitski

References

External links
IIHF.com

I
World Junior Ice Hockey Championships – Division I
International ice hockey competitions hosted by Italy
International ice hockey competitions hosted by Hungary
IIHF
IIHF